Lycaeninae, the coppers, are a subfamily of the gossamer-winged butterflies (Lycaenidae).

The relationships of the Lycaenidae are not fully resolved. Sometimes the Polyommatinae and Theclinae are included in the Lycaeninae; in particular the Theclinae tribe Eumaeini contains many similar taxa. Consequently, the delimitation of the Lycaeninae is by no means definitely resolved; many genera await conformation of placement. Regardless, it is today generally considered better to restrict the Lycaeninae to the immediate relatives of the type genus Lycaena, and one or two clades close to that group.

Taxonomy
The Lycaeninae sensu stricto can be divided into two tribes:

Heliophorini
 Heliophorus – sapphires 
 Iophanus
 Melanolycaena
Lycaenini
 Athamanthia
 Gaeides (often included in Lycaena)
 Hyrcanana
 Lycaena – typical coppers
 Phoenicurusia

A few genera included in the Lycaeninae in the most extensive circumscriptions are now placed in subfamilies as distinct as the Poritiinae. Finally, there are some genera of uncertain status as regards their systematics and taxonomic validity. They might, if valid, be members of the monophyletic Lycaeninae, but this requires confirmation: 
 Alciphronia
 Apangea
 Kulua
 Mirzakhania
 Nesa

Footnotes

References

  (2008): Tree of Life Web Project – Lycaeninae. Version of 2008-APR-29. Retrieved 2009-FEB-18.

Further reading
 Glassberg, Jeffrey Butterflies through Binoculars, The West (2001)
 James, David G. and Nunnallee, David Life Histories of Cascadia Butterflies (2011)
 Pelham, Jonathan Catalogue of the Butterflies of the United States and Canada (2008)
 Pyle, Robert Michael The Butterflies of Cascadia (2002)

External links
Butterflies and Moths of North America
Butterflies of America

 
Butterfly subfamilies
Taxa named by William Elford Leach